Stenoptilia karsholti is a moth of the family Pterophoridae. It is known from Peru.

Adults are on wing at the end of March and the beginning April.

The host plant is unknown, but adults have been recorded flying around a Gentiana species.

External links

karsholti
Moths of South America
Moths described in 1995
Taxa named by Cees Gielis